The Army of the Federation of Bosnia and Herzegovina was the military of the Federation of Bosnia and Herzegovina created after the 1995 Dayton Agreement. It consisted of two merging units which had been in conflict with each other during the Croat-Bosniak War: the Bosniak Army of the Republic of Bosnia and Herzegovina (ARBiH) and the Croat Croatian Defence Council (HVO). In 2005 it was integrated into Armed Forces of Bosnia and Herzegovina controlled by the Ministry of Defense of Bosnia and Herzegovina.

Equipment
Infantry
Rifle

Main Battle Tank

Aircraft

See also 
Army of the Republic of Bosnia and Herzegovina
Croatian Defence Council
Army of Republika Srpska
War in Bosnia and Herzegovina

References 

Military history of Bosnia and Herzegovina
Military units and formations established in 1995
Military units and formations disestablished in 2005
1995 establishments in Bosnia and Herzegovina
2005 disestablishments in Bosnia and Herzegovina